The 1994 U.S. Open was the 94th U.S. Open, held June 16–20 at Oakmont Country Club in Oakmont, Pennsylvania, a suburb northeast of Pittsburgh. Ernie Els, age 24, won the first of his four major titles on the second sudden-death hole to defeat Loren Roberts, after Colin Montgomerie was eliminated in an 18-hole playoff. (Both Roberts and Montgomerie were winless in major championships, but each won several senior majors while on the Champions Tour.) It was the seventh U.S. Open and tenth major held at Oakmont, and was Arnold Palmer's final U.S. Open as a participant.

Palmer's last
Palmer, age 64, played in his final U.S. Open in 1994. He had not played in the tournament in eleven years, since it was last at Oakmont in 1983, but received an exemption by the USGA to play in his home state. As an amateur, his first U.S. Open in 1953 was also played at Oakmont, won by Ben Hogan.

Television
This was the last U.S. Open for ABC Sports, which had televised the U.S. Open in the United States since 1966, 29 consecutive years. NBC Sports televised the event for twenty years, from 1995 through 2014. Starting in 2015, Fox Sports began a 12-year contract to televise the championship and other USGA events. NBC regained the rights to the U.S. Open in 2020 after taking over Fox's contract.

Course layout

Source:

Lengths of the course for previous major championships:

, par 71 - 1983 U.S. Open
, par 71 - 1978 PGA Championship
, par 71 - 1973 U.S. Open
, par 71 - 1962 U.S. OpenBefore 1962, the 1st hole was played as a par 5.

, par 72 - 1953 U.S. Open
, par 72 - 1951 PGA Championship
, par 72 - 1935 U.S. Open
, par 72 - 1927 U.S. Open
, par 74 - 1922 PGA Championship

Past champions in the field

Made the cut

Missed the cut

Round summaries

First round
Thursday, June 16, 1994

Second round
Friday, June 17, 1994

Amateurs: Alexander (+7).

Third round
Saturday, June 18, 1994

Final round
Sunday, June 19, 1994

Els shot a 66 (−5) in the third round to take a two-shot lead. At the start of the Sunday's final round, Els was the beneficiary of a controversial ruling. After he hit his opening drive into deep rough, a tournament official ruled that a broadcast truck and aerial camera was in his line of play. He was allowed to take a drop in a spot where escape was much more likely, but still ended up with a bogey on the hole. Afterwards, some pundits suggested that the ruling was wrong and Els should have been forced to play from his original location, since it was possible to move the aerial camera out of the way. Roberts and Montgomerie both recorded a 70 (−1) in the round to challenge Els. Roberts could have posted a −6 (278) clubhouse score, but he missed a par putt on the 18th. Strange was in contention most of the day, but made bogeys on 15 and 16 and a birdie on 18 left him at −4 (280).  Els needed par on the last to hold off Roberts and Montgomerie, but he hit his drive into the rough and made bogey from there, forcing a three-way playoff. It was the first three-way playoff at the U.S. Open in 31 years, when Julius Boros defeated Jacky Cupit and Palmer in 1963.

Scorecard
Final round

Cumulative tournament scores, relative to par

Source:

Playoff
Monday, June 20, 1994

All three players struggled as the Monday playoff began. Montgomerie recorded double-bogey at the 2nd, 3rd, and 11th and fell out of contention. Els began the playoff bogey-triple bogey, while Roberts double-bogeyed the 5th. Roberts had a one-stroke lead over Els on the 16th, but he bogeyed the hole to fall into a tie. Els and Roberts both carded a 74 (+3), while Montgomerie finished with a 78 (+7) and was eliminated.

After halving the first extra hole with pars, they headed to the 11th where Roberts found a greenside bunker on his approach while Els safely hit the green. After Roberts' par putt lipped out, Els two-putted for par and the championship. It was the second time for sudden-death at the U.S. Open, which was first implemented in 1990. It was needed again in 2008.

 Els and Roberts were tied at 74 (+3) after 18 holes; Montgomerie was four strokes back and was eliminated.
 The sudden-death playoff began on the back nine and Els (4-4) defeated Roberts (4-5) on the second hole.

Scorecard 

Cumulative playoff scores, relative to par
{|class="wikitable" span = 50 style="font-size:85%;
|-
|style="background: Pink;" width=10|
|Birdie
|style="background: PaleGreen;" width=10|
|Bogey
|style="background: Green;" width=10|
|Double bogey
|style="background: Olive;" width=10|
|Triple bogey+
|}
Source:

References

External links
USGA Championship Database
USOpen.com – 1994

U.S. Open (golf)
Golf in Pennsylvania
U.S. Open
U.S. Open (golf)
U.S. Open
U.S. Open